Pennantia corymbosa, commonly known as kaikomako (from the Māori ), is a small dioecious forest tree of New Zealand.

Small creamy, white flowers are produced between November and February, followed by a shiny black fruit in autumn. They are a favourite food of the New Zealand bellbird.

The Māori name  means food of the bellbird. Traditionally, Māori used the tree to make fire by repeatedly rubbing a pointed stick into a groove on a piece of mahoe.

An English name is "duck's foot", coming from the shape of the juvenile plant's leaf. Juvenile plants have small leaves with tangled, divaricating stems, while mature plants have much larger leaves and a normal tree architecture.

References

Trees of New Zealand
Divaricating plants
Pennantiaceae